Mirko Jozić (born 8 April 1940) is a Croatian retired professional football manager and player.

Managerial career
As manager, he won the 1987 FIFA World Youth Championship in Chile with the Yugoslavia under-20 national team composed of famous names such as Zvonimir Boban, Predrag Mijatović, Robert Prosinečki and Davor Šuker.
He coached Chilean side Colo-Colo between 1989 and 1993, winning the Copa Libertadores in 1991. Jozić is the first European to have won the Copa Libertadores.

He led the Croatia national team at the 2002 FIFA World Cup.

Managerial statistics

Honours

Clubs
Junak Sinj
Yugoslav Third League: 1970–71

Colo-Colo
Primera División (3): 1990, 1991, 1993
Copa Apertura (1): 1990
Copa Libertadores (1): 1991
Recopa Sudamericana (1): 1992

Al-Hilal
Asian Cup Winners' Cup (1): 1996–97

National team
Yugoslavia U-20
FIFA World Youth Championship: 1987

Individual
HNS's Trophy Trophies: 1984
Matija Ljubek Award: 2011

Orders
 Order of Danica Hrvatska with face of Franjo Bučar - 1995

References

1940 births
Living people
People from Trilj
Association football midfielders
Yugoslav footballers
FK Tekstilac Derventa players
RNK Split players
NK Belišće players
NK Junak Sinj players
Yugoslav football managers
Croatian football managers
Colo-Colo managers
Chile national football team managers
Club América managers
HNK Hajduk Split managers
Al Hilal SFC managers
Newell's Old Boys managers
Sporting CP managers
Croatia national under-21 football team managers
Croatia national football team managers
Chilean Primera División managers
Liga MX managers
Saudi Professional League managers
Primeira Liga managers
2002 FIFA World Cup managers
Yugoslav expatriate football managers
Yugoslav expatriate sportspeople in Chile
Croatian expatriate football managers
Croatian expatriate sportspeople in Chile
Croatian expatriate sportspeople in Mexico
Croatian expatriate sportspeople in Saudi Arabia
Croatian expatriate sportspeople in Argentina
Croatian expatriate sportspeople in Portugal
Expatriate football managers in Chile
Expatriate football managers in Mexico
Expatriate football managers in Saudi Arabia
Expatriate football managers in Argentina
Expatriate football managers in Portugal